Mihail Petrov Ganev (Bulgarian: Михаил Петров Ганев, born January 5, 1985) is a freestyle wrestler from Bulgaria who won the world title in the 84 kg division in 2010. He was eliminated in the second bout at the 2016 Olympics.

In December 2010 he was stabbed in the stomach with a knife and was out of training for a month. He lost another four months from March to July 2015 due to an injury. He withdrew from the 2016 European Championships due to another injury, to a knee ligament.

References

External links 
 

Living people
1985 births
Bulgarian male sport wrestlers
World Wrestling Championships medalists
Wrestlers at the 2016 Summer Olympics
Olympic wrestlers of Bulgaria
European Wrestling Championships medalists
People from Veliko Tarnovo
Sportspeople from Veliko Tarnovo Province
20th-century Bulgarian people
21st-century Bulgarian people